Fax is a surname. Notable people with the surname include:

 Elton Fax (1909–1993), American illustrator, cartoonist, and author
 Jesslyn Fax (1893–1975), American actress
 Mark Fax (1911–1974), American composer
 Matt Fax (born 1996), French electronic musician and record producer